David Lewis Willacy (13 June 1916 – 1 September 1941) was an English professional footballer who played as a winger in the Scottish Football League for Queen of the South and the Football League for Preston North End.

Personal life
Willacy was married and served as a sergeant in the Royal Air Force Volunteer Reserve during the Second World War. He was killed in a training accident flying Hawker Hurricane V7467 on 1 September 1941. Willacy was buried at Annan Cemetery.

Career statistics

References

1916 births
1941 deaths
Sportspeople from Lancashire
Association football wingers
English footballers
English Football League players
Scottish Football League players
Queen of the South F.C. players
Preston North End F.C. players
Royal Air Force Volunteer Reserve personnel of World War II
Royal Air Force airmen
Royal Air Force pilots of World War II
Royal Air Force personnel killed in World War II
Aviators killed in aviation accidents or incidents in England
Victims of aviation accidents or incidents in 1941
British World War II fighter pilots
Military personnel from Lancashire